Ryan Krause (born June 16, 1981 in Omaha, Nebraska) is a former American football tight end. He was drafted by the San Diego Chargers in the sixth round of the 2004 NFL Draft. He played college football at Nebraska-Omaha.

Krause has also been a member of the Green Bay Packers and Houston Texans.

External links
Houston Texans bio

1981 births
 Living people
 Sportspeople from Omaha, Nebraska
 American football tight ends
 Nebraska–Omaha Mavericks football players
 San Diego Chargers players
 Green Bay Packers players
 Houston Texans players